Carbutamide (brand name Glucidoral) is an anti-diabetic drug of the sulfonylurea class, developed by Servier.

It is classified as first-generation.

It was patented in 1953 and approved for medical use in 1956.

See also
 Hellmuth Kleinsorge (1920-2001) German medical doctor

References

Potassium channel blockers
Benzenesulfonylureas
Anilines
Butyl compounds